Walter Henderson may refer to:

 Walter Henderson (athlete) (1880–1944), British track and field athlete
 Walter Henderson (politician) (1891–1968), Canadian Member of Parliament
Walt Henderson, character in Paris, Texas (film)
Walt Henderson, character in Thea (TV series)